The uterine cavity is the inside of the uterus. It is triangular in shape, the base (broadest part) being formed by the internal surface of the body of the uterus between the openings of the fallopian tubes, the apex by the internal orifice of the uterus through which the cavity of the body communicates with the canal of the cervix. The uterine cavity where it enters the openings of the fallopian tubes is a mere slit, flattened antero-posteriorly.

References 

Uterus